Knut Andreas Fjeldsgaard (born 19 May 1952) is a Norwegian former ice hockey player who played for the club IF Frisk Asker. He was born in Oslo. He played for the Norwegian national ice hockey team at the 1980 Winter Olympics.

References

External links

1952 births
Living people
Sportspeople from Bergen
Norwegian ice hockey players
Olympic ice hockey players of Norway
Ice hockey players at the 1980 Winter Olympics